The Men's points race was held on 21 October 2011. 28 riders participated, the distance was 40 km (160 laps) with a sprint every 10 laps for extra points. A lap would have gotten 20 points. Two heats were held over 20 km to determine the final riders.

Medalists

Results

Heats
The races were held at 16:20. The top 10 riders of each heat advanced to the final.

Heat 1

Heat 2

Final
The final was held at 21:49.

References

2011 European Track Championships
European Track Championships – Men's points race